Lease of Life is a 1954 British drama film made by Ealing Studios and directed by Charles Frend.  The film was designed as a star-vehicle for Robert Donat, representing his return to the screen after an absence of over three years during which he had been battling the chronic asthma which plagued his life and career.  It was a prestige production which was generally respectfully, if not over-enthusiastically, received and gained Donat a nomination as 'Best British Actor' at the 1955 British Academy Film Awards.  In common with a number of other Ealing films of the era, Lease of Life focuses on a specific English milieu – in this case a Yorkshire village and its nearby cathedral city – and examines the nuances, quirks and foibles of its day-to-day life.  The film is unique in the Ealing canon in having religion as its dominant theme.

It bears several parallels to the 1952 Japanese film Ikiru ("to live") but with a much lighter tone.

Plot
Rev William Thorne (Robert Donat) is the vicar of the village of Hinton St. John, living with his wife Vera (Kay Walsh) and his daughter Susan (Adrienne Corri) (an exceptionally gifted teenage pianist). Susan gets guidance in her potential concert potential from Martin Blake (Denholm Elliott). However Rev and Mrs Thorne cannot afford to pay for her accommodation in London even if she wins a scholarship.

Although the church is the focus of the local community, the Thornes live a frugal life of having to struggle and scrimp to make ends meet financially.  Vera is a typical clergy wife, having to sublimate her own needs and desires to the exigencies of her husband's position, as a result tending to live life vicariously through her daughter, whose musical gifts she is determined must not be wasted.

A local elderly farmer Mr Sproatly asks him to visit his sick bed. He says he wishes to ensure that his son rather than his wife gets his money when he dies. He is about to entrust Rev Thorne with the cash when the wife enters and the plan is abandoned, The farmer's son is still listed as "missing" after the war and he hopes he will rematerialise.

While working hard on a sermon he has been asked to present for a boys school, he collapses while reaching up for a book in his library.

On discovering from his doctor that he has less than a year to live, he sympathises with the doctor having to give such news. He goes to Gilchester Cathedral to contemplate, then takes the bus back to his village. The organ music from the cathedral rings in his head. On getting off the bus two women from the church committee discuss the drunkenness of the sexton (gravedigger) Mr Spooner and the vicar says he will deal with him appropriately: he tells him to suck a mint if he sees the women coming.

He returns to the farmer and takes a leather case containing a will and large amount of cash. The wife challenges him.

Thorne reevaluates his own life and that of his parishioners, and he finds himself happier than before. He adopts a "live and let live" attitude to the minor indiscretions of his parishioners, and turns a blind eye to the pious village gossip.

Unaware that the sermon to the boys school is a test to see if he is fit to act as School Chaplain, he rips up his prepared speech in front of the boys and gives an ad lib sermon regarding the benefits of not obeying rules and enjoying life. The boys love the sermon, but the Dean, headmaster and assembled parents see it as inciting rebellion. A reporter prints the story and a wider story of inciting unrest spreads. The congregation of his own church swells... but he feels this is "a herd not a flock", people wishing sensationalism.

He now feels able to speak completely honestly about his beliefs and does his best to demonstrate to his parishioners that religion is not a matter of unthinking adherence to a fixed set of rules, but of freedom to act according to one's conscience.  However some of his pronouncements are willfully misunderstood and deemed provocative and controversial.  There also remains the worry about how to secure the necessary funds to pay for Susan's tuition at a music college, and fate happens to put temptation in the way.

When Mr Sproatly dies Rev Thorne at last checks the bag of money and it is £100 short - exactly the amount Mrs Thorne gave to Susan claiming she had sold her jewels. He confronts his wife and she confesses the crime saying it as just borrowing it. Mrs Sproatly challenges him about the money in the churchyard after her husband's funeral and he is stressed. Back in the church he collapses. The reporter who had been covering the story tells Mrs Thorne that the editor has agreed to pay £100 for Thorne's articles: the problem is solved.

Thorne's spirit is revived and he heads to preach his evening service, stopping to discuss the merits of acting for the living rather than the dead with the gravedigger.

Cast
 Robert Donat as Rev. William Thorne
 Kay Walsh as Vera Thorne
 Adrienne Corri as Susan Thorne
 Denholm Elliott as Martin Blake
 Walter Fitzgerald as the Dean
 Reginald Beckwith as Foley
 Cyril Raymond as Headmaster
 Vida Hope as Mrs. Sproatley
 Beckett Bould as Mr. Sproatley
 Jean Anderson as Miss Calthorp
 Russell Waters as Russell
 Alan Webb as Dr. Pembury
 Richard Wattis as Solicitor
 Richard Leech as Carter
 Frederick Piper as Jeweller
 Mark Daly as Spooner
 Frank Atkinson as Verger
 Edie Martin as Miss. Calthorp's Friend (non-speaking)

Location filming
Exterior sequences for Lease of Life were filmed in Beverley (East Yorkshire) and the nearby village of Lund (Hinton St. John) in the East Riding of Yorkshire. The railway scenes in the film were filmed at Windsor & Eton Central station.  The church scenes were filmed in Beverley Minster, East Yorkshire.

References

External links 
 
 
 

1954 films
1954 drama films
British drama films
Ealing Studios films
Films directed by Charles Frend
Films set in Yorkshire
1950s English-language films
1950s British films